This is a list of 2001 events that occurred in Europe.

Events

January

February 
 February 19 – The 2001 UK foot-and-mouth crisis begins.
 February 28 – The Great Heck rail crash occurs.

March 

 March 4 – A bomb explodes at BBC Television Centre in London, UK.

April 
 April 1 - Former Federal Republic of Yugoslavia President Slobodan Milošević surrenders to police special forces, to be tried on charges of war crimes.

May 
 May 13 – Silvio Berlusconi wins the general election and becomes Prime Minister of Italy for the second time.

June

July 
 July 7 – 2001 Bradford riots: Race riots erupt in Bradford in the north of England
 July 19 – UK politician and novelist Jeffrey Archer is sentenced to 4 years in prison for perjury and perverting the course of justice.
 July 20–22 – The 27th G8 summit takes place in Genoa, Italy. Massive demonstrations are held against the meeting by members of the anti-globalization movement. One demonstrator, Carlo Giuliani, is killed by a policeman.
 July 24 – Simeon Saxe-Coburg-Gotha, deposed as the last Tsar of Bulgaria when a child, is sworn in as the democratically elected 48th Prime Minister of Bulgaria.

August

September 
 September 21
 Teenager Ross Parker murdered in racially motivated attack by Muslim Asian gang in Peterborough.
In Toulouse, France, the AZote Fertilisant chemical factory explodes, killing 29 and seriously wounding over 2,500.
 September 27 – Zug massacre: In Zug, Switzerland, Friedrich Leibacher shoots 18 citizens, killing 14 and then himself.

October

November

December

Deaths

January

February

March

April

May

References 

 
2000s in Europe
Years of the 21st century in Europe